Dream FM  was a London pirate radio station active in the 1990s, that championed happy hardcore music.

Dream FM started broadcasting in January 1994 from Battersea, South West London, having briefly been named Global FM. Dream played predominantly happy hardcore and breakbeat hardcore but also jungle and house, during the transitional period where breakbeat music was fragmenting into different genres. In March 1995, Dream moved to 107.6 FM, with the station promoting raves at London venues such as Club Labrynth, Bagley's, Adrenalin Village, and the Gardening Club II. It hosted live outside broadcasts from its events and had phone-ins and on-air games such as Beat The Raid.

In April 1996, Dream was included in a BBC First Sight documentary about pirate radio in London.

Between 1996 and 1998, Dream produced a monthly magazine, Dream Magazine, which was available on the high-street.

DJs and MCs that played on Dream include: DJ Spinback (its original founder), Swifflee & Fiaz (who managed the station), MC Suicide, Rhythm Master, Boots Hi-Fi, Groove Vandal, Tom Thumb, MC Livelee, MC Ruff, Extreme, Jimmy J, Krazy G & Phantom D, MC Stevie A, DJ Uproar & MC Sniper, DJ Wise, Innocence & Influence, MC Base, Reds & Gussy, DJ Energy, DJ Eclipse & MC Twilight, and Rise & Shine.

Dream FM ceased broadcasting on 13 April 1997, hosting a farewell party on 19 April at London's Linford Film Studio venue.

References

Radio stations in London
Pirate radio stations in the United Kingdom
Radio stations established in 1994
Radio stations disestablished in 1997
Defunct radio stations in the United Kingdom
Electronic dance music radio stations in the United Kingdom